Dilanka Auwardt (born 27 August 1990) is a Sri Lankan cricketer. He made his first-class debut on 2 March 2012, for Police Sports Club in the 2011–12 Premier Trophy.

References

External links
 

1990 births
Living people
Sri Lankan cricketers
Colts Cricket Club cricketers
Sri Lanka Navy Sports Club cricketers
Sri Lanka Police Sports Club cricketers
Sportspeople from Kurunegala